Rhamphina rectirostris is a species of fly in the family Tachinidae.

Distribution
Spain.

References 

Fauna of Spain
Diptera of Europe
Dexiinae
Insects described in 1971